Sarpsborg 08 Fotballforening, commonly known as Sarpsborg 08 or simply Sarpsborg, is a Norwegian football club based in Sarpsborg, playing in Eliteserien. Sarpsborg 08 and its predecessors played in 1. divisjon from 2005 to 2010. In 2010, the club was promoted to the Tippeligaen, the top league in Norway, but finished last and was relegated back to 1. divisjon in 2011. In 2012, they were promoted again and 6 years after, they qualified for their first Europa League group stage. They play their home games at Sarpsborg Stadion.

History

Pre-existence
Football in Sarpsborg has traditionally been dominated by Sarpsborg FK (SFK), which won the Norwegian Cup six times and played 20 seasons in the top division, and to a lesser extent IL Sparta, which won the Norwegian Cup in 1952 and played nine seasons in the top division. However, after SFK's relegation from the 1974, no teams from Sarpsborg played in the top division for the next two decades. In 1999, 16 teams in the Sarpsborg area joined forces to create a team that could compete in the top divisions of Norwegian football, called Sarpsborg Fotball, which overtook SFK's spot in the league-system. In its first season, the team was relegated from the 2. divisjon, and several clubs, including both SFK and Sparta, withdrew from the collaboration.

The remaining clubs in the "Sarpsborg Fotball" project formed a new club called Borg Fotball, which won promotion to the 2. divisjon in 2002, but was relegated again in 2003. Meanwhile, Sparta was promoted to the Second Division the same season, and re-entered the collaboration club which now was renamed FK Sparta Sarpsborg. The club earned promotion to 1. divisjon (the second tier of Norwegian football) in 2005.

Foundation
At the end of the 2007 season, the last major club in the district, Sarpsborg FK, joined the collaboration of teams and ended a rather long and hefty rivalry between the two clubs. At the same time, in an effort to unite the different factions within the collaboration, the jersey was changed and the club renamed itself Sarpsborg Sparta FK. This name remained a source of contention throughout the 2008 season, however, and a new name, Sarpsborg 08 FF, was adopted in 2009.

The 2009 season started badly for Sarpsborg, and it appeared they would be fighting against relegation to the 2. divisjon. The situation worsened when the Football Association of Norway determined that Sarpsborg 08 had submitted an unrealistic budget when they obtained their license to play in the 1. divisjon, and were penalized three points in June, leaving Sarpsborg in a relegation spot. However, after Roar Johansen became coach, the second part of the season went well for the team, which not only climbed out of the relegation spots, but finished fifth, allowing them to participate in the qualification matches for the 2010 Tippeligaen. In the semi-final match of the qualification, Sarpsborg defeated local rivals Fredrikstad FK 2–0 (who were therefore relegated from the top division). In the home match of the qualification final, Sarpsborg defeated Kongsvinger 3–2, but lost the second leg 3–1 and remained in the 1. divisjon.

Promotions and development
The 2010 season ended with a 4–0 home-win against Alta. This meant that the team ended in second place, after league-winner Sogndal, and won the right to play in the 2011 edition of the Tippeligaen.

The 2011 season started with a surprising 3–0 win against Molde in Ole Gunnar Solskjær first match as manager of Molde. But after a good start, Sarpsborg was relegated back to 1. divisjon on 23 October 2011, when they lost 3–0 away at Brann with three rounds left to play. The club finished last with only 21 points.

In the 2012 season, Sarpsborg finished the 1. divisjon in second place and was promoted to Tippeligaen. On 3 January 2013, former Sheffield United striker Brian Deane was appointed as head coach. In 2015, Geir Bakke took over as head coach and led the club to their first Norwegian Cup final. They lost the 2015 Norwegian Football Cup Final 0−2 against Rosenborg. In 2017 they repeated the feat and reached the final again, but lost 2–3 against Lillestrøm. Sarpsborg finished in third place in the 2017 Eliteserien, their first medal-winning position in club history.

On 30 August 2018 Sarpsborg 08 qualified for the group stage of the 2018–19 UEFA Europa League for the first time in history.

African springboard 
Sarpsborg 08 has gained a reputation as one of the best springboards for African players in need of a European acclimatization club. Senegalese Makthar Thioune played three years for Sparta Sarpsborg and Sarpsborg Sparta (Sarpsborg 08's predecessors) in the second tier, and when Molde purchased him in 2009 he was immediately "Player of the Year" in the top league, with the third highest rating in a 25-year period. He later played in Germany. Another big Sarpsborg 08 transfer in 2014 happened when Guangshou R&F manager Sven Göran Eriksson purchased Aaron Samuel from Sarpsborg 08 for €1.4m. Samuel blossomed in Sarpsborg with 13 goals in a year, after only 2 goals in big city club Vålerenga. He also scored both his goals for Nigeria in 2014. In 2017 Sarpsborg 08 signed Krepin Diatta from Senegal. He hardly played in his first half year in the club, but then blossomed with 5 goals and 8 assists in 3 months. Diatta was then sold to Brügge for €2.65m and later to Monaco for €16.7m. In 2019 Sarpsborg 08 signed Malian Ismaila Coulibaly and while acclimatized he only started 5 matches in the first 35 league matches while in the club. Then he was given the chance at a time the club was rock bottom with five losses in five matches. The club then took 17 points in the next 6 weeks and Coulibaly dominated with 4 goals, leading to Sheffield United purchasing him for €2m. Being only the 16th largest municipality in Norway, the processing of African teenage talents has been a major success factor leading to Sarpsborg 08 fighting above the size of the city.

Recent history
{|class="wikitable"
|-bgcolor="#efefef"
! Season
! League
! Pos.
! Pl.
! W
! D
! L
! GS
! GA
! P
!Cup
! Top scorer
! Player of the year 
!Notes
|-
|colspan="12" align=center|Pre-existence
|-
|2000
|2. divisjon
|align=right bgcolor="#FFCCCC"| 9
|align=right|22||align=right|6||align=right|7||align=right|9
|align=right|33||align=right|36||align=right|25
|First round
|align=center|Jon Bjerkholt
|align=center|
|As Sarpsborg Fotball, relegated to the 3. divisjon
|-
|2001
|3. divisjon
|align=right |5
|align=right|22||align=right|12||align=right|2||align=right|8
|align=right|47||align=right|33||align=right|38
|First round
|align=center|Pål Østby
|align=center|
|As Navestad in tables, commercial name was FF Sarpsborg
|-
|2002
|3. divisjon
|align=right bgcolor=#DDFFDD| 1
|align=right|22||align=right|19||align=right|2||align=right|1
|align=right|76||align=right|14||align=right|59
|First round
|align=center|Jørn Holmen
|align=center|
|Name changed to Borg Fotball, promoted to 2. divisjon
|-
|2002
|3. divisjon
|align=right |2
|align=right|22||align=right|16||align=right|5||align=right|1
|align=right|67||align=right|27||align=right|53
|First round
|align=center|
|align=center|
|As FK Sparta Sarpsborg, status as secondary club
|-
|2003
|2. divisjon
|align=right bgcolor="#FFCCCC"| 11
|align=right|22||align=right|5||align=right|9||align=right|12
|align=right|35||align=right|56||align=right|24
|Second round
|align=center|Gjermund B. Hansen
|align=center|
|As Borg Fotball, relegated to the 3. divisjon, name changed to FK Sparta Sarpsborg 2
|-
|2003
|3. divisjon
|align=right bgcolor=#DDFFDD| 1
|align=right|22||align=right|17||align=right|4||align=right|1
|align=right|88||align=right|24||align=right|55
|Second round
|align=center|Lasse Alexandersen
|align=center|
|As FK Sparta Sarpsborg, promoted to the 2. divisjon
|-
|2004
|2. divisjon
|align=right |2
|align=right|26||align=right|16||align=right|4||align=right|6
|align=right|63||align=right|38||align=right|52
|Second round
|align=center|Lasse Alexandersen
|align=center|
|As FK Sparta Sarpsborg, now defined as primary club
|-
|2005
|2. divisjon
|align=right bgcolor=#DDFFDD| 1
|align=right|26||align=right|21||align=right|1||align=right|4
|align=right|90||align=right|28||align=right|64
|Second round
|align=center|Ronald Turner
|align=center|
|Promoted to the 1. divisjon
|-
|2006
|1. divisjon
|align=right |10
|align=right|30||align=right|11||align=right|6||align=right|13
|align=right|44||align=right|56||align=right|37
|First round
|align=center|Fredrik Dahm
|align=center|Makhtar Thioune
|
|-
|2007
|1. divisjon
|align=right |13
|align=right|30||align=right|8||align=right|8||align=right|14
|align=right|50||align=right|52||align=right|32
|Second round
|align=center|Bjørnar Johannessen
|align=center|Bjørnar Johannessen
|Avoided relegation because Raufoss had its license revoked
|-
|colspan="12" align=center|Club history
|-
|2008
|1. divisjon
|align=right |10
|align=right|30||align=right|10||align=right|7||align=right|13
|align=right|45||align=right|43||align=right|37
||Third round
|align=center|Martin Wiig
|align=center|Are Tronseth
|Name changed to Sarpsborg Sparta FK
|-
|2009
|1. divisjon
|align=right |5
|align=right|30||align=right|15||align=right|5||align=right|10
|align=right|47||align=right|38||align=right|47
||Second round
|align=center|Martin Wiig
|align=center|Are Tronseth
|Name changed to Sarpsborg 08 FF
|-
|2010
|1. divisjon
|align=right bgcolor=#DDFFDD| 2
|align=right|28||align=right|16||align=right|6||align=right|6
|align=right|54||align=right|36||align=right|54
||Third round
|align=center|Martin Wiig & Morten Giæver
|align=center|Ole Heieren Hansen
|Promoted to the Tippeligaen
|-
|2011
|Tippeligaen
|align=right bgcolor="#FFCCCC"| 16
|align=right|30||align=right|5||align=right|6||align=right|19
|align=right|31||align=right|65||align=right|21
||Fourth round
|align=center|Martin Wiig
|align=center|Øyvind Hoås
|Relegated to the 1. divisjon
|-
|2012
|1. divisjon
|align=right bgcolor=#DDFFDD| 2
|align=right|30||align=right|19||align=right|6||align=right|5
|align=right|73||align=right|43||align=right|63
||Third round
|align=center|Martin Wiig
|align=center|Tom Erik Breive
|Promoted to the Tippeligaen
|-
|2013
|Tippeligaen
|align=right |14
|align=right|30||align=right|8||align=right|7||align=right|15
|align=right|40||align=right|58||align=right|31
||Second round
|align=center|Martin Wiig & Moi Elyounoussi
|align=center|Duwayne Kerr
|
|-
|2014
|Tippeligaen
|align=right |8
|align=right|30||align=right|10||align=right|10||align=right|10
|align=right|41||align=right|48||align=right|40
|bgcolor="#c96"|Semifinal
|align=center|Bojan Zajic
|align=center|Joachim Thomassen
|
|-
|2015
|Tippeligaen
|align=right |11
|align=right|30||align=right|8||align=right|10||align=right|12
|align=right|37||align=right|49||align=right|34
|style="background:silver;"|Runners-up
|align=center|Bojan Zajic
|align=center|Anders Trondsen
|
|-
|2016
|Tippeligaen
|align=right |6
|align=right|30||align=right|12||align=right|9||align=right|9
|align=right|35||align=right|37||align=right|45
||Quarterfinal
|align=center|Pål A. Kirkevold
|align=center|Sigurd Rosted
|
|-
|2017
|Eliteserien
|align=right bgcolor="#c96"|3
|align=right|30||align=right|13||align=right|12||align=right|5
|align=right|50||align=right|36||align=right|51
|style="background:silver;"|Runners-up
|align=center|Patrick Mortensen
|align=center|Sigurd Rosted
|
|-
|2018 
|Eliteserien
|align=right |8
|align=right|30||align=right|11||align=right|8||align=right|11
|align=right|46||align=right|39||align=right|41
||Third round
|align=center|Patrick Mortensen
|align=center|Joachim Thomassen
|Europa League group stage
|-
|2019 
|Eliteserien
|align=right |12
|align=right|30||align=right|5||align=right|15||align=right|10
|align=right|30||align=right|40||align=right|30
||Third round
|align=center|Kristoffer Zachariassen
|align=center|Kristoffer Zachariassen
|
|-
|2020
|Eliteserien
|align=right |12
|align=right|30||align=right|8||align=right|8||align=right|14
|align=right|33||align=right|43||align=right|32
||Cancelled
|align=center|Mustafa Abdellaoue
|align=center|Anton Saletros
|
|-
|2021 
|Eliteserien
|align=right |8
|align=right|30||align=right|11||align=right|6||align=right|13
|align=right|39||align=right|44||align=right|39
||Quarterfinal
|align=center|Ibrahima Koné
|align=center|Bjørn Inge Utvik
|
|-
|2022 
|Eliteserien
|align=right |8
|align=right|30||align=right|12||align=right|5||align=right|13
|align=right|57||align=right|54||align=right|41
||Second round
|align=center|
|align=center|
|
|}

European record 

Notes
 1QR: First qualifying round
 2QR: Second qualifying round
 3QR: Third qualifying round
 PO: Play-off round

Players

Current squad

Out on loan

Notable players
Below are notable players who have represented Sarpsborg 08. To appear in the section below, a player must have either at least two international matches or Champions League matches (group stage or later), 150 official club matches or 30 club goals, including appearances and goals for preceding teams mentioned in pre-existence phase. Players are sorted by birth date.

 Peter Kovacs
 Tom Erik Breive
 Berat Jusufi
 Kjetil Berge
 Martin Wiig
 Øyvind Hoås
 Jeremy Berthod
 Makhtar Thioune
 Duwayne Kerr
 Ole Heieren Hansen
 Kyle Lafferty
 Ole Jørgen Halvorsen
 Erton Fejzullahu
 Joachim Thomassen
 Joackim Jørgensen
 Guillermo Molins
 Jordan Adeoti
 Patrick Mortensen
 Þórarinn Valdimarsson
 Kristinn Jónsson
 David Mitov Nilsson
 Sheldon Bateau
 Henrik Ojamaa
 Mikael Dyrestam
 Joonas Tamm
 Guðmundur Þórarinsson
 Wilmer Azofeifa
 Aaron Samuel
 Sigurd Rosted
 Felix Michel
 Mohamed Elyounoussi
 Anders Trondsen
 Kamer Qaka
 Orri Ómarsson
 Sulayman Bojang
 Krepin Diatta

Managers

References

External links

  
 Supporter site 

 
Football clubs in Norway
Eliteserien clubs
Association football clubs established in 2008
2008 establishments in Norway
Sport in Sarpsborg